Richard Walton (12 September 1924 – 23 June 2012) was an English professional footballer who made over 130 appearances in the Football League for Exeter City as a right back. He also played league football for Leyton Orient.

Personal life 
Walton later worked as an assistant accountant in Kent.

References 

English Football League players
English footballers
Clapton Orient F.C. wartime guest players
Association football fullbacks
Footballers from Kingston upon Hull
1924 births
2012 deaths
Leicester City F.C. players
Leyton Orient F.C. players
Exeter City F.C. players
Tonbridge Angels F.C. players
Sittingbourne F.C. players